"So Fine" is a song by the American rock band Guns N' Roses, released as a promotional single in 1992. It features bassist Duff McKagan on lead vocals, with Axl Rose singing the intro song's verses. The song, written entirely by McKagan, is a tribute to Johnny Thunders.

McKagan regularly sang the song during the Use Your Illusion Tour. The song was rehearsed during a soundcheck while Duff was guesting with Guns N' Roses during their Appetite for Democracy 2014 tour, but wasn't played live. The song made a reappearance after a 27 year absence during the Guns N' Roses 2020 Tour.

Reception
Spin complimented McKagan's vocals when reviewing the song, comparing it to Ziggy Stardust-era David Bowie.

Personnel
Guns N' Roses
W. Axl Rose – co-lead vocals
Slash – lead guitar
Izzy Stradlin – rhythm guitar, backing vocals
Duff McKagan – bass, lead vocals
Matt Sorum – drums, backing vocals

Additional musicians
Howard Teman – piano

References

Guns N' Roses songs
Songs written by Duff McKagan
1991 songs